Christian Mistral (3 November 1964 – 23 November 2020) was a Canadian novelist, poet, and songwriter from Quebec.

Career
He was most noted for his debut novel Vamp, which was a shortlisted nominee for the Governor General's Award for French-language fiction at the 1988 Governor General's Awards.

His most famous work as a songwriter, "La lune", was recorded by pop singer Isabelle Boulay for her 1998 album États d'amour. He has also written songs for Dan Bigras and Luce Dufault, as well as "Un Bateau dans une bouteille", the theme song for Montreal's 350th anniversary celebrations.

Death
Mistral died on November 23, 2020, aged 56.

Works
Vamp, (1988)
Vautour (1990)
Fatalis (1992)
Papier mâché/Carton-pâte (1989)
Valium (2000)
Sylvia au bout du rouleau ivre (2001)
Vacuum (2003)
Fontes (2004)
Léon, Coco et Mulligan (2007)

References

External links

 
 

1964 births
2020 deaths
20th-century Canadian novelists
21st-century Canadian novelists
20th-century Canadian poets
21st-century Canadian poets
Canadian male novelists
Canadian male poets
Canadian novelists in French
Canadian poets in French
Canadian songwriters
Writers from Montreal
French Quebecers
20th-century Canadian male writers
21st-century Canadian male writers